The Rugby Football Union South West Division is a rugby union governing body for South West England and is part of the Rugby Football Union.

Constituent Bodies

 Berkshire
 Buckinghamshire
 Cornwall
 Devon
 Dorset & Wilts
 Gloucestershire
 Oxfordshire

Leagues
It organises the following leagues: 

South West Premier (tier 5)
South West 1 East (6)
South West 1 West (6)  
Southern Counties North (7)
Southern Counties South (7)
Western Counties North (7)
Western Counties West (7)
Cornwall/Devon (8)
Cornwall 1 (9)
Cornwall 2 (10)
Devon 1 (9)
Gloucester Premier (8)
Gloucester 1 (9)
Gloucester 2 North (10)
Gloucester 2 South (10)
Tribute Somerset Premier (8)
Somerset 1 (9)
Somerset 2 North (10)
Somerset 2 South (10)
Somerset 3 North (11)
Somerset 3 South (11)
Berks/Bucks & Oxon Premier (8)
Berks/Bucks & Oxon Championship (9)
Dorset & Wilts 1 North (8)
Dorset & Wilts 1 South (8)
Dorset & Wilts 2 North (9)
Dorset & Wilts 2 South (9)
Dorset & Wilts 3 North (10)
Dorset & Wilts 3 South (10)

Cups
Clubs also take part in the following national cup competitions:
RFU Intermediate Cup
RFU Senior Vase
RFU Junior Vase

See also
London & SE Division
Midland Division
Northern Division
English rugby union system

References

External links
 South West RFU Competitions

South West